Andrey Rublev defeated Jiří Veselý in the final, 6–3, 6–4 to win the men's singles title at the 2022 Dubai Tennis Championships. It was Rublev's tenth career singles title. Veselý entered the tournament ranked as the world No. 123, and was the lowest-ranked finalist in the tournament's history.

Aslan Karatsev was the defending champion, but lost to Mackenzie McDonald in the first round.

This tournament marked Novak Djokovic’s first appearance of the season, as he was unable to compete at the Australian Open due to the cancellation of his visa. As a result of his quarterfinal loss to Veselý, Djokovic lost the world No. 1 ranking to Daniil Medvedev.

Seeds

Draw

Finals

Top half

Bottom half

Qualifying

Seeds

Qualifiers

Lucky loser

Qualifying draw

First qualifier

Second qualifier

Third qualifier

Fourth qualifier

References

External links
 Main draw
 Qualifying draw

Dubai Tennis Championships - Men's 1
Singles men